George Marshall Varnell (August 10, 1882 – February 4, 1967) was an American track and field athlete, Gonzaga University's first basketball coach, college football who refereed a record-setting eight Rose Bowl games, and sports editor of two major Pacific Northwest newspapers.  He competed in the 1904 Summer Olympics, finishing fourth in the 200 metre hurdles event as well as fourth in the 400 metre hurdles competition. Varnell served as the referee during the 1919 Rose Bowl between Oregon and Harvard.

Varnell was born in Chicago, Illinois.  He joined the staff of the Spokane Daily Chronicle in 1908 and later became sports editor for the newspaper.  He moved to Seattle, Washington in 1925, where was a sports editor and associated editor for The Seattle Times until his retirement in 1966. During his time in Seattle, Varnell was extremely supportive of The Boys in the Boat and covered their team for decades, including the 1936 team that won a gold medal in the Olympics in Germany. Varnell died on February 4, 1967, at a hospital in Seattle, following an illness lasting 18 months.

References

External links
 

1882 births
1967 deaths
American male hurdlers
Athletes (track and field) at the 1904 Summer Olympics
Basketball coaches from Illinois
College football officials
Gonzaga Bulldogs football coaches
Gonzaga Bulldogs men's basketball coaches
Olympic track and field athletes of the United States
The Seattle Times people
Sportspeople from Chicago
Sportswriters from Washington (state)
Track and field athletes from Chicago
Track and field athletes from Seattle